Esfandiar (also Romanized as Esfandīār and Esfandīyār; also known as Isfandiyār) is a village in Kavir Rural District, Deyhuk District, Tabas County, South Khorasan Province, Iran. In 2006, its population was 1,019 from 278 families.

References 

Populated places in Tabas County